Achyra affinitalis, the cotton web spinner, is a moth of the family Crambidae. It was described by Julius Lederer in 1863 and is found in Australia and New Zealand.

Description

The wingspan is about 20 mm.

Host plants

The larvae feed on Helianthus annuus, Medicago sativa, Linum usatissimum, Gossypium hirsutum, Sorghum bicolor and Atriplex species.

References

External links
Images of Achyra affinitalis larvae

Moths described in 1863
Moths of Australia
Moths of New Zealand
Pyraustinae
Taxa named by Julius Lederer